Edward Black may refer to:
 Edward Black (minister) (1793–1845), Canadian minister and teacher
 Edward Black (producer) (1900–1948), English film producer
 Edward Junius Black (1806–1846), American politician, U.S. Representative for Georgia
 Edward Black (soldier) (1853–1872), youngest serving soldier of the American Civil War
 Eddie Wolecki Black (born 1965), Scottish football player and manager